Relative Ways is an EP released by the band ...And You Will Know Us by the Trail of Dead for Interscope Records.

The 4-song EP was released in late 2001, setting the stage for the early 2002 release of their first major label full-length Source Tags & Codes, which contains all of the EP's tracks with the exception of "The Blade Runner."

Track listing

References

...And You Will Know Us by the Trail of Dead albums
Interscope Records EPs
2001 EPs